Banki may refer to:
 Banki turbine, a type of water turbine
 Donát Bánki, inventor of the carburetor
 KB Banki, a northern European bank, headquartered in Reykjavík, Iceland
 Kamen Rider Banki, a character from Kamen Rider Hibiki
Bańki, Poland
 Banki, Croatia, a village near Poreč

Banki may also refer to several places in India:
 Banki, Odisha
 Banki, Uttar Pradesh
 Barabanki District

See also
Banky, a surname and given name